Jang Hang-sun (born Kim Bong-soo on February 22, 1947) is a South Korean actor.

Filmography

Film

Television series

Awards and nominations

References

External links 
 
 
 
 

1947 births
Living people
20th-century South Korean male actors
21st-century South Korean male actors
South Korean male film actors
South Korean male television actors
Gwangsan Kim clan